Chandiroor is a village in Alappuzha district, Kerala, India. It is situated on National Highway 47 between Eramalloor and Aroor. It is part of the Aroor Assembly constituency and the Alappuzha Parliamentary constituency. Historically, it was located in the Travancore kingdom.

Location

NH66 is the main connectivity and backwaters also.

Economy
Sea food processing is the main industry. Shrimp farming, pisciculture and coir products manufacture are also means of livelihood.

Notable people
 Karunakara Guru, founder of Santhigiri Ashram
 Mammootty, Malayalam cinema actor

Schools
Chandiroor GHSS
Our Lady Of Mercy HSS
Al Ameen Public School
Jamia Milliyya Arabic college
Heavens Qur'anic Pre-school

Politics
 The main front is LDF. K.R Gauriamma represented this constituency until last term from the birth of Kerala. She belongs to JSS. Now Daleema represents the constituency.

References

Villages in Alappuzha district